Səkəşam (also, Sekəşam, Sekashan, and Sekesham) is a village that forms part of the municipality of Siyətük, in the Astara Rayon of Azerbaijan.

References 

Populated places in Astara District